Calyptridium umbellatum, synonym Cistanthe umbellata, is a species of flowering plant in the montia family known by the common name Mount Hood pussypaws or — especially outside the Pacific Northwest — simply pussy-paws.

Range
Calyptridium umbellatum is native to western North America from British Columbia to California to Colorado, where it grows in a number of habitat types, including areas inhospitable to many other plant types, such as those with alpine climates.

A small subgroup of C. umbellatum are located in the Zayante Sandhills, a biological island in the Santa Cruz Mountains. These individuals reside on a singular hill in the entirety of the sandhills, and their frail petals and loose seeds allow for easy wind dispersal.

Habit
It is a perennial herb forming generally two or more basal rosettes of thick, spoon-shaped leaves each a few centimeters long. The inflorescence arises from the rosette, a dense, spherical umbel of rounded sepals and four small petals.

C. umbellatum usually has only one inflorescence per basal rosette; the related C. monospermum generally has more than one.

References

External links

Jepson Manual Treatment
Photo gallery

Montiaceae
Plants described in 1853
Flora of Western Canada
Flora of British Columbia
Flora of California
Flora of Colorado
Flora of Idaho
Flora of Montana
Flora of Nevada
Flora of Oregon
Flora of Utah
Flora of Washington (state)
Flora of Wyoming
Flora without expected TNC conservation status